FC Metiznik Magnitogorsk was a Russian football team from Magnitogorsk. It played professionally from 1993 to 1997. Their best result was 4th place in Zone 6 of the Russian Second Division in 1993.

Team name history
 1992: FC Metiznik-Alternativa Magnitogorsk
 1993–1997: FC Metiznik Magnitogorsk

External links
  Team history at KLISF

Association football clubs established in 1992
Association football clubs disestablished in 1998
Defunct football clubs in Russia
Sport in Chelyabinsk Oblast
1992 establishments in Russia
1998 disestablishments in Russia